The Hondo River is a river of Hormigueros, Puerto Rico. It runs through the municipalities of Hormigueros, Mayagüez, and Cabo Rojo.

See also

List of rivers of Puerto Rico

References

External links
 USGS Hydrologic Unit Map – Caribbean Region (1974)
 Rios de Puerto Rico

Rivers of Puerto Rico